An elephants' graveyard (also written elephant graveyard, elephant's graveyard, or elephants' cemetery) is a place where, according to legend, older elephants instinctively direct themselves when they reach a certain age. According to this legend, these elephants would then die there alone, far from the group. However, there is no evidence in support of the existence of the elephants' graveyard.

Origin
Several theories have been proposed to explain the origin of this myth. One theory involves people finding groups of elephant skeletons together, or observing old elephants and skeletons in the same habitat.  Others suggest the term may spring from group die-offs, such as one excavated in Saxony-Anhalt, which had 27 Palaeoloxodon antiquus skeletons.  In that particular case, the tusks of the skeletons were missing, which indicated either hunters killed a group of elephants in one spot, or else opportunistic scavengers removed the tusks from a natural die-off. 

Other theories focus on elephant behavior during lean times, suggesting starving or elderly elephants who have worn their teeth down to a point that they can no longer chew tougher foods gather in places where finding food is easier, and subsequently die there. Prolific elephant hunter Walter "Karamojo" Bell discounted the idea of the elephant's graveyard, stating that bones and "tusks were still lying about in the bush where they had lain for years".

Popular culture 
The idea of a graveyard for elephants was popularised in films such as Trader Horn and MGM's Tarzan films, in which groups of greedy explorers attempt to locate the elephants' graveyard, on the fictional Mutia Escarpment, in search of its riches of ivory.  Osamu Tezuka's Kimba the White Lion episode "A Friend in Deed" centred around it.

Disney's 1994 animated musical film The Lion King has a reference to this motif, as well as its musical adaptation and the 2019 remake of the film. In "Fearful Symmetry",  an episode from The X-Files which revolves around a mysterious invisible elephant, a character refers to this.

The Cartoon Network series Primal episode "A Cold Death" depicts a similar locale, a mammoth's graveyard, at the episode's end.

Derivative meanings
 In geology, "elephants' graveyard" is an informal term for a hypothetical accumulation of "large blocks of country rock stoped from the roofs of batholiths".  
In military settings, it is sometimes used as a slang term to describe postings or assignments for senior officers for whom there is no potential for further promotion.
 In Spain, the Spanish Senate is often criticised as a cementerio de elefantes where politicians who have lost their previous positions end up doing no productive work.
 It is a term for the offices and a secretary provided to former high-ranking executives of large companies (at least in the United States), who have either retired or resigned. An executive who relinquishes or is relieved of authority becomes a consultant (special adviser) where they continue to receive a salary and an office under their contract but have little or no actual responsibilities (known as garden leave in the United Kingdom), until their non-compete agreement expires.
Additionally the term "elephants' graveyard" has been deliberately used in a symbolic fashion to refer to specific paleontological sites, such as the elephant-fossil deposit that René Jeannel, professor at the French National Museum of Natural History, discovered during a Kenya & Ethiopia expedition in 1932.

See also
 Elephant cognition and reports of elephant death rituals.

References

External links
 Teeth, second dentition, tusks – Contains information about the relevance of elephant teeth to the elephant graveyard myth

Animal cemeteries
Graveyard
Animals in mythology
Urban legends